Misconception is a 2014 American documentary film directed by Jessica Yu about population growth. It reveals a world of crisis pregnancy centers. The film has been reviewed on Slant Magazine and TheWrap.

References

External links
 

2014 films
2014 documentary films
2010s American films
2010s English-language films
American documentary films
Films directed by Jessica Yu
Participant (company) films
English-language documentary films